The Cocoa Research Institute of Ghana (CRIG) is a research institute in the Eastern Region, Ghana, created after Ghana became independent and left the West African Cocoa Research Institute.

References

Research institutes in Ghana